Goriran may refer to:

Goriran-e Olya
Goriran-e Sofla